Siri Hall Arnøy (born 28 November 1978, in Oslo) is a former Norwegian politician for the Socialist Left Party.

She was elected to the Norwegian Parliament from Akershus in 2001, but was not re-elected in 2005. She then served in the position of deputy representative during the term 2005–2009.

Arnøy is openly lesbian.

In 2012 she took the PhD at the Norwegian University of Science and Technology with the thesis The Hopeful Hydrogen. Scientists Advocating Their Matter of Concern.

References

1978 births
Living people
Members of the Storting
Lesbian politicians
Women members of the Storting
Norwegian LGBT politicians
Socialist Left Party (Norway) politicians
Norwegian University of Science and Technology alumni
21st-century Norwegian politicians
20th-century Norwegian women politicians
20th-century Norwegian politicians
21st-century Norwegian women politicians
LGBT legislators